Hurley and Wood End is a ward within North Warwickshire, it is named after the villages of Hurley and Wood End, the ward also contains the villages of Piccadilly, Hurley Common and Foul End. The ward is covered by Kingsbury Civil Parish.

Profile
The ward is within the mining area of the Warwickshire Coalfield. There were two mines in the ward one being Kingsbury Colliery near Piccadilly which closed 1968 and Dexter Colliery in Hurley which closed in the 1980s. Kingsbury Oil Terminal also lies within the Ward. Because of the wards status as an old mining community it is considered a Safe Labour seat.

Settlements

Wood End

Wood End is the largest settlement in the village and is home to both councillors of the ward, Wood End dates from 1890 and is an old Pit village it has a school, a church and several shops, a village hall and a garage.

Hurley

Hurley the oldest village is the ward and the second largest Hurley dates from before the mining era of the 1890s. it has a shop, a school, a church, a pub and a village hall.

Piccadilly

Piccadilly is a Hamlet in the ward, it is the newest settlement in the ward dating from 1904 and is named after Piccadilly in London, Piccadilly is the only settlement with a Birmingham (B) postcode.

Foul End

Foul End is an area to the south of Hurley, Foul End Consists of several farms.

Hurley Common

Hurley Common is the smallest settlement in the ward and is just a simple hamlet with a pub.

Election results

External links
 Kingsbury Parish Council
 North Warwickshire Borough Council
 2011 Local Election results (North Warwickshire)

Borough of North Warwickshire
Wood End, Atherstone